Esad Sejdic is a Yugoslavian former footballer.

Football career
Back in 1996, Singaporean club Balestier Central got the attackers' services where he scored the first-ever S.League goal, netting it in a match confronting Police FC. One week later, he made the S.League's first hat-trick in a 4-1 win, with his club coming third by the end of the season. Signing for Woodlands Wellington in 1997 with Croatian Sandro Radun, their applications were rejected by the Singapore Football Association; in response, they asked FIFA to allow their documents, who in turn forced the Association to repay the player, with Sejdic's extra money amounting to 40700 Singaporean dollars. The S.League supporters also wrote splenetic responses to the newspaper, saying that Sejdic should play.

Violating Muslim ordinance by being in the same house with an Islamic woman without being a Muslim himself, the Yugoslavian was released by Negeri Sembilan in 2004.

Other
Owning three to four restaurants in Singapore, two went bankrupt in 2015 and he had to reduce one restaurants staff to four full-timers in 2016 following the hookah ban.

References

Association football forwards
Serbian football managers
Living people
Serbia and Montenegro expatriate sportspeople in Singapore
Expatriate footballers in Singapore
Singapore Premier League players
Balestier Khalsa FC players
Hong Kong Rangers FC players
Woodlands Wellington FC players
Negeri Sembilan FA players
Serbian footballers
Serbia and Montenegro expatriate footballers
Serbia and Montenegro expatriate sportspeople in Malaysia
Serbia and Montenegro expatriate sportspeople in Hong Kong
Perak F.C. players
Expatriate footballers in Malaysia
Expatriate footballers in Hong Kong
Tampines Rovers FC players
FK Novi Pazar players
Year of birth missing (living people)
Serbia and Montenegro footballers
Serbian expatriate sportspeople in Singapore
Serbian expatriate football managers